Aaron Karo (born June 18, 1979) is an American comedian and author best known for his Ruminations email column and series of books, his young adult novel Lexapros and Cons, and his Comedy Central special Aaron Karo: The Rest Is History.

Career
In September 1997, as a freshman at the University of Pennsylvania's Wharton School, Karo sent a humorous email about college to twenty of his friends.  That email spawned an "email column" called Ruminations on College Life that Karo began sending on a regular basis.  Through forwarding and word-of-mouth, the column spread and readers began subscribing to receive the column directly.  Karo continued to write the column after college, shortening the title to simply Ruminations.

On July 10, 2002, Karo made his stand-up comedy debut at Stand-Up New York in New York City.
 
In August 2002, Simon & Schuster published a collection of Karo's columns, also entitled Ruminations on College Life. It is currently in its ninth printing.

In May 2005, Simon & Schuster published Karo's second book, Ruminations on Twentysomething Life, a collection of Karo's post-college columns.

In July 2005, Karo moved from New York to Los Angeles and began to write for television. He has since developed projects for 20th Century Fox, MTV, Warner Brothers, CBS Paramount, and a sitcom entitled Ruminations for The CW.

In August 2008, Karo announced the launch of Ruminations.com, a user-generated humor site that allowed fans to write their own "ruminations" and share them with the community. The site received half a million submissions before being shuttered in 2012.

On August 15, 2008, Karo performed on The Late Late Show with Craig Ferguson on CBS.

On December 9, 2008, Comedy Central Records released Karo's debut stand-up album Just Go Talk to Her. The album reached number eight on the iTunes comedy bestseller list.

On September 15, 2009, HarperCollins published Karo's third book, I'm Having More Fun Than You. Described as a "tribute to modern bachelorhood," the book reached number one on Amazon.com’s humor bestseller list.

On November 19, 2010, Comedy Central premiered his first one-hour stand-up special Aaron Karo: The Rest Is History. An album by the same name was released the following day; it reached number one on Amazon.com's comedy bestseller list.

On April 10, 2012, Karo's fourth book and first novel, a work of young adult fiction, was published by Farrar, Straus and Giroux. Lexapros and Cons is the story of Chuck Taylor, a teenager with obsessive–compulsive disorder who is obsessed with Converse and prescribed the antidepressant Lexapro.

On April 30, 2012, Karo's third stand-up album, I Need to Tell You Something, was released. His fourth album, Charm/Offensive, was released in 2015.

On September 17, 2012, the fifteenth anniversary of his first email, Karo ended his Ruminations column after expanding his mailing list from twenty friends to 100,000 worldwide subscribers.

In January 2015, Publishers Weekly reported that Karo's fifth book, a novel titled Galgorithm, would be published in summer 2015. It was later re-released in paperback under the title Me You Us.

In October 2015, Variety reported that Karo was developing a sitcom for CBS called Squad Goals, executive produced by Ryan Seacrest.

In March 2016, it was reported that Karo was developing an animated series for Comedy Central called Germany, starring Channing Tatum.

In April 2018, Deadline reported that Karo was developing a series for Comedy Central called Living the Dream, starring DJ Dillon Francis.

In December 2018, Variety reported that Karo was developing a series for TBS called Strange Times, with former Blink-182 member Tom DeLonge.

Education
Graduated from Plainview-Old Bethpage John F. Kennedy High School in Plainview, New York on Long Island, in June 1997.  The original twenty friends that Karo sent the first Ruminations email to are purported to also be from Plainview.

Graduated magna cum laude with a Bachelor of Science in Economics from the Wharton School of the University of Pennsylvania in May 2001. Was a member of the Zeta Beta Tau fraternity.

References

External links
 AaronKaro.com
 Ruminations column archive
 Twitter
 Facebook
 Instagram

1979 births
Living people
American columnists
American humorists
American stand-up comedians
American Internet celebrities
Wharton School of the University of Pennsylvania alumni
People from Plainview, New York
21st-century American comedians
Comedians from New York (state)